Strømnes is a Norwegian surname. Notable people with the surname include: 

Åsmund L. Strømnes (1927–2009), Norwegian educationalist
Steinar Strømnes (born 1987), Norwegian footballer

Norwegian-language surnames